Carbon dioxide enrichment can mean:

 CO2 fertilization effect
 Free-air concentration enrichment (FACE)
 For use in greenhouses see Greenhouse#Carbon dioxide enrichment